Heswall is a town on the Wirral, Merseyside, England.  At the 2001 Census, the population was 16,012, including the nearby villages of Barnston and Gayton.

Before local government reorganisation on 1 April 1974 it was part of the administrative county of Cheshire.

Geography
Located on the eastern side of the Dee Estuary, with views across the river to North Wales, Heswall is about 20 minutes' drive from the Roman city of Chester and about 20 minutes' drive from Liverpool. The towers of Liverpool's cathedrals can be seen on the horizon from high ground.

History

Early History
Before the Norman Conquest, Heswall has been cited as a possible location for Dingesmere, mentioned with regard to the Battle of Brunanburh, in Egil's Saga. Heswall was recorded in the Domesday Book of 1086 as Eswelle, owned by Robert de Rodelent, who also owned much of the land on the eastern side of the River Dee. In 1277, it became the property of Patrick de Haselwall, who was Sheriff of Cheshire.

Development
In 1801, the population was recorded as 168. By the census in 1841, it had grown to 398. Before 1897 it was known as Hestlewelle or Hesselwelle. Its growth was started by wealthy merchants from Liverpool; they had originally chosen it as a retreat, but the arrival of two railway connections allowed them to commute. One line is the Borderlands Line from Wrexham Central to Bidston which opened in 1896. This line is still active and has Heswall railway station on the eastern edge of the town. The station was formerly called Heswall Hills to distinguish it from the older, now demolished, Heswall Station. The old station was in Station Road in the Lower Village on another line from West Kirby to Hooton. This opened in 1886 but the line closed to passengers in 1956. The track of the old railway became a footpath, the Wirral Way.

The speedy development of Heswall has seen the once separate villages of Gayton, Heswall, Pensby and Thingwall become joined by continuous housing.

Architecture
The oldest structure is the tower of St Peter's Parish Church, which is about 500 years old. The present church was built in 1879, and is the third to have been built on the site. The previous church was destroyed by a violent thunderstorm on 19 September 1875; the organist and the boy who pumped the bellows for the organ were both killed.

The remains of Gayton's windmill, which stopped operating in 1860 and is now converted into a house, can be seen close to the Devon Doorway Restaurant on Gayton Roundabout, a short distance back up Telegraph Road towards Heswall.

The Royal Liverpool Children's Hospital originally opened in Heswall as Liverpool Country Hospital for Children in 1909. The hospital was situated on a  site purchased in 1900. It stood on the opposite side of Telegraph Road from 'The Puddydale’ and had a clock tower and grounds with views over the Dee estuary. The hospital closed in 1985 and there is now a Tesco supermarket on the site. The supermarket was extended in the early 2000s, then refurbished during 2011.

Economy

An affluent area, Heswall was listed as the seventh richest neighbourhood in the UK in 2001, with an average household income of £46,600.

In 2022, the median house price in Heswall was £409,500, making it the most expensive in the Wirral area.

Open spaces

There are several areas of open space. The largest is the Dales, an area of dry, sandy heathland overlooking the River Dee. It has the status of both Site of Special Scientific Interest (SSSI) and Local Nature Reserve (LNR). Within this SSSI lies 'the Dungeon', a small river valley cut into the hillside. A path connects the Dales to the Wirral Way and the coast. Other open areas also overlooking the Dee are the Beacons, and Poll Hill, which is the highest point on the Wirral Peninsula. Whitfield Common, off Whitfield Lane, contains open land as well as playing fields and tennis courts.

Education
Heswall is well served by St Peter’s C of E, Gayton and Heswall Primary Schools.

Pensby High School is the local secondary school situated in nearby Pensby.

Heswall Primary School

Heswall Primary School serves the local community of Heswall and surrounding areas on the Wirral Peninsula.

Heswall Primary School opened in 1909. It was originally on the eastern edge of The Puddydale, opposite the Royal Liverpool Children’s hospital on Telegraph Road (now converted into a local Tesco). The original building was demolished in 1982 after falling into disrepair. Prior to demolition, the juniors were moved to the current Whitfield Lane site in 1976 and the school became known as Whitfield Primary School.  The infants joined the juniors in 1982 unifying the school on one site again – eventually becoming Heswall County Primary school.

The current Whitfield Lane site was formerly the location of the Beehive Dairy. The school has retained the Beehive logo in its school badge. The single form entry school has 220+ children on roll. Now known as Heswall Primary School, the school is surrounded by the Barnston fields and has its own field and wooded areas.

The school is the home of Wirral Science Under the Stars, an event run by the school that brings together science links in real life settings with education.

Transport

Rail

Bus

Heswall bus station is owned and managed by Merseytravel. The bus station consists of four stands. The main bus operators at Heswall are Arriva North West, Stagecoach Merseyside & South Lancashire, Eazibus, A2B Travel and Helms Coaches.

Notable people

 The singer Ian Astbury, most famous for fronting the rock band The Cult, was born in Heswall.
 Cricketer Ian Botham (Lord Botham) was born in Heswall.
 TV presenter Jim Bowen was born in Heswall.
 England, Everton and Sunderland footballer Paul Bracewell was born in Heswall.
 TV presenter  Fiona Bruce was educated at Gayton Primary School in Heswall.
Christian Furr, the youngest artist to have officially painted Queen Elizabeth II, was born in Heswall.
 Pianist Stephen Hough CBE is from Heswall.
 Philip May, husband of former Prime Minister Theresa May, was brought up in Heswall and was a pupil at Heswall Primary School and Calday Grange Grammar School, in Caldy. The May family lived on Downham Road North for 16 years.
 In 1964, Paul McCartney bought "Rembrandt", a detached mock-Tudor house in Baskervyle Road, Heswall, for his father, Jim McCartney at a cost of £8,750. The senior McCartney later moved to a bungalow nearby, and lived in Heswall until his death on 18 March 1976.
Singer and bass guitarist Andy McCluskey, co-founder of the electronic band Orchestral Manoeuvres in the Dark (OMD), was born in Heswall.
 Phil Morris MBE, former soldier, double cancer survivor and winner of a David Cameron award for services to cancer awareness and support. Awarded an MBE in the Queen's Birthday Honours 2021
 Hugh O'Leary, accountant, husband of former UK Prime Minister Liz Truss
 Disc jockey and broadcaster John Peel was also born in Heswall.
 Bill Steer, British guitar player, and co-founder of the extreme metal band Carcass, spent his teenage years living in Heswall, and went to Heswall Primary School on Whitfield Lane.
 John Williams (27 May 1946 – 12 August 1978), English motorcycle short-circuit road racer who also entered selected Grands Prix, lived on Whitfield Lane, Heswall.

Cultural references 
Heswall Flower Club is mentioned in the song "This One's For Now" by the band Half Man Half Biscuit on their 2014 album Urge For Offal. Heswall Village Fete is the scene for Coldplay's "Life in Technicolor II" music video. Heswall is the destination on the front of a bus in the 2014 John Lewis Christmas advert, 'Monty The Penguin'.

Sport 

Heswall F.C., founded in 1891, play at Gayton Park on Brimstage Road and competes in the West Cheshire Association Football League.

Heswall Lawn Tennis Club, based at Quarry Road East for over 100 years, competes in the Cheshire Lawn Tennis Association Inter Club League.

Heswall Golf Club, on Cottage Lane, was founded in 1902 and has an 18-hole championship golf course.

See also

Listed buildings in Heswall

References

Further reading

External links

 Town website
 LowerVillage.co.uk
 Heswall Dales SSSI
 Merseytravel
 Wirral community magazine
 Heswall Magazine

Towns and villages in the Metropolitan Borough of Wirral
Towns in Merseyside